Mahatma Gandhi Heberpio Mattos Pires (born 18 February 1992), simply known as Mahatma Gandhi or just Mahatma, is a Brazilian professional footballer who plays as a defender for Iporá on loan from Atlético Clube Goianiense.

Club career 
Named after Mahatma Gandhi, Gandhi joined Atlético Clube Goianiense. His debut season in the Serie A came in 2011, but he spent most of his time on the bench. He made seven Serie A appearances in 2012. In 2013, he played four matches for Serie B, but did not get a chance to play in 2014. He was part of the 2014 Campeonato Goiano winning team, where he made five appearances in the state league.

References 

1992 births
Living people
Association football defenders
Brazilian footballers
Atlético Clube Goianiense players
Campeonato Brasileiro Série A players
Campeonato Brasileiro Série B players
Sportspeople from Goiânia
21st-century Brazilian people